You Never Can Tell is an 1897 four-act play by George Bernard Shaw that debuted at the Royalty Theatre.   It was published as part of a volume of Shaw's plays entitled Plays Pleasant.

Characters
Mr. (or Dr.) Valentine, the dentist                        –  Mr. Yorke Stephens
Gloria Clandon, the eldest daughter                   –  Miss Margaret Halstan
Walter, the waiter                                                –  Mr. James Welch
Dolly Clandon, twin to Philip                               –  Miss Winifred Fraser
Philip Clandon, twin to Dolly                               –  Mr. Roland Bottomley
Mrs. Clandon, the mother                                   –  Miss Elsie Chester
Mr. Fergus Crampton, the landlord and father   –   Mr. Herman Vezin
Mr. Finch McComas, a solicitor                          –   Mr. Sydney Warden
Bohun, a QC (Queens Counsel)                        –   Mr. Charles Charrington
The Parlor-maid                                                 –   Miss Mabel Hardinge  
Jo, another waiter                                              –   Mr. Edward Knoblauch
The Cook                                                           –   Mr. Leopold Profeit

Produced under the direction of Mr. James Welch

Plot
The play is set in a seaside town and tells the story of Mrs Clandon and her three children, Dolly, Phillip and Gloria, who have just returned to England after an eighteen-year stay in Madeira.

The children have no idea who their father is and, through a comedy of errors, end up inviting him to a family lunch. At the same time, a dentist named Valentine has fallen in love with the eldest daughter, Gloria, who considers herself a modern woman and claims to have no interest in love or marriage.

The play continues with a comedy of errors and confused identities, with the friendly and wise waiter, Walter (most commonly referred to by the characters as "William," because Dolly thinks he resembles Shakespeare), dispensing his wisdom with the titular phrase "You Never Can Tell."

Setting
Time: One Day in August 1896

Place: An English seaside resort

Act I A dentist's office
Act II The Terrace of The Marine Hotel
Act III The Clandons sitting room at The Marine Hotel
Act IV The Clandons sitting room at The Marine Hotel – Later at Night

In performance

You Never Can Tell has also been performed at the Shaw Festival, Niagara-on-the-Lake, Ontario several times: in 1963, 1973, 1979, 1988, 1995, 2005 and most recently in 2015.
'You Never Can Tell' aired on 'BBC Play of the Month' on October 30, 1977, with Robert Powell as Dr Valentine, Judy Parfitt as Mrs. Clandon and Cyril Cusack as the Waiter·

Audio adaptations
The BBC broadcast a production on 31 July 1971 starring Freddie Jones as William the Waiter, Prunella Scales as Gloria Clandon, Denys Hawthorne as Valentine, Godfrey Kenton as Mr. Crampton, Jo Manning Wilson as Dolly, Lockwood West as Mr. McComas and Nigel Anthony as Philip.

The CBC broadcast a production in 1973 with Frances Hyland as Mrs. Clandon, Tony Van Bridge as Mr. Crampton, Chris Wiggins as William the Waiter, Maureen Fitzgerald as Gloria, Drew Russell as Valentine and William Osler as Mr. Bohun.

Another BBC production was broadcast on 29 September 2013 directed by Martin Jarvis and starring Ian Ogilvy as William the Waiter, Jamie Bamber as Valentine, Christopher Neame as Mr. Crampton, Moira Quirk as Dolly, Adam Godley as Mr. McComas and Rosalind Ayres as Mrs Clandon.

References

External links

 
 Costume sketches and set designs by Motley Theatre Design Group – Motley Collection of Theatre & Costume Design

1899 plays
Plays by George Bernard Shaw